Rabiya Shah (born 27 April 1992;) is a Pakistani former cricketer who played as a wicket-keeper and left-handed batter. She appeared in 25 One Day Internationals and 15 Twenty20 Internationals for Pakistan between 2010 and 2017. She played domestic cricket for Karachi and Zarai Taraqiati Bank Limited.

References

External links
 
 

1992 births
Shah, Rabiya
Cricketers from Karachi
Pakistani women cricketers
Pakistan women One Day International cricketers
Pakistan women Twenty20 International cricketers
Karachi women cricketers
Zarai Taraqiati Bank Limited women cricketers